Beni Territory is a territory in North Kivu, Democratic Republic of the Congo.

It has been the site of fighting during the Allied Democratic Forces insurgency between government troops and the ADF militia, which also crosses the border into the territory from Uganda.

References

Territories of North Kivu Province